Anna's Reservoir Conservation Reserve is a protected area in the Northern Territory of Australia.

The traditional owners of the area are the Anmatyerre peoples.

The first European to visit the area was John McDouall Stuart in April 1860 while on expedition through the area. Stuart named the rock-hole after the youngest daughter of James Chambers, who had sponsored the expedition. Stuart visited the rock-hole on his next three attempts to reach the north coast of Australia. Other travellers and the builders of the Overland Telegraph Line all used the reservoir for water.

Alfred Giles made use of the reservoir when overlanding 4,000 cattle and 8,000 sheep to establish Springvale Station near Katherine in 1879.

In 1980, the conservation reserve was listed on the now-defunct Register of the National Estate.  In 1995, it was listed on the Northern Territory Heritage Register.

The conservation reserve is categorised as an IUCN Category V protected area.

See also
Protected areas of the Northern Territory

References

Conservation reserves in the Northern Territory
Protected areas established in 1971
1971 establishments in Australia
Northern Territory places listed on the defunct Register of the National Estate
Northern Territory Heritage Register